Rouxiella chamberiensis is a member of the family Yersiniaceae. It is implicated in the deaths of three infants in France, and was found to be a contaminant of parenteral nutrition bags.

References

External links

Type strain of Rouxiella chamberiensis at BacDive -  the Bacterial Diversity Metadatabase

Bacteria described in 2015